Dalhalla is an open air theatre located in a former limestone quarry, and is used as a summer music venue.

It was in operation until 1990. The open air theater was opened in 1995 and currently has 4,000 seats. The acoustical qualities are comparable to the best outdoor stages in Europe.

Dalhalla presents 20-30 events each summer, from June to the beginning of September with a combination of opera, choral works, jazz and popular concerts making up the bulk of the program.

In 2005, guest performers came from the Bolshoi Theatre in Moscow, and Mikis Theodorakis celebrated his 80th birthday. In June 2007, English rock group Procol Harum performed with the Gävle Symphony Orchestra and the Dala Sinfonietta Choir, conducted by David Firman.

See also 
 List of contemporary amphitheatres
 List of opera festivals

References

External links 

 Dalhalla official site,

Music venues in Sweden
Buildings and structures in Dalarna County
Tourist attractions in Dalarna County